White Level is an unincorporated community in eastern Franklin County, North Carolina, United States.

It is located at the intersection of White Level Road (SR 1425) and Wood Road (SR 1459), east-northeast of Louisburg, at an elevation of 325 feet (99 m).

References

Unincorporated communities in Franklin County, North Carolina
Unincorporated communities in North Carolina